The 1953 County Championship was the 54th officially organised running of the County Championship. Surrey won the Championship title.

On 16 May 1953, the match between Surrey and Warwickshire finished within the first day, with Surrey winning by an innings and 49 runs.

Table
12 points for a win
6 points to side still batting in the fourth innings of a match in which scores finish level
4 points for first innings lead in a lost or drawn match
2 points for tie on first innings in a lost or drawn match
If no play possible on the first two days, the match played to one-day laws with 8 points for a win.

The match between Northamptonshire and Middlesex at Peterborough ended in a tie, and both sides were awarded six points.

References

1953 in English cricket
County Championship seasons